Bazhenovo is a rural locality (a selo) in Bakhtybayevsky Selsoviet, Birsky District, Bashkortostan, Russia. The population was 569 as of 2010. There are 10 streets.

Geography 
Bazhenovo is located 13 km north of Birsk (the district's administrative centre) by road. Vyazovsky is the nearest rural locality.

References 

Rural localities in Birsky District